The 2017 ADAC Opel Rallye Cup season is the fifth season of the one-make series for Opel Adam rally cars.

Calendar

Drivers

Championship standings
Points were awarded to the top 20 finishers on the basis below:

 Additional points were awarded to the top three finishers on each event's Power Stage, on a 3–2–1 basis. Five points were also awarded to the driver with most stage wins at an event.

References

External links
 ADAC Motorsport website
 Punktetabelle Opel 2017 

2017 in rallying
2017 in German motorsport